Bella Vista is a border town in northeast of Paraguay, bordering the Brazilian town of Bela Vista, Mato Grosso do Sul. Both towns are divided by the Apa River, only connected by a borderbridge. It is a small town in the northern region of Amambay. Getting there is possible by way of Brazil or over a red earth road from the Paraguayan country-side.

Sources 
World Gazeteer: Paraguay – World-Gazetteer.com															

Populated places in the Amambay Department